Kayf Tara (18 March 1994 – 8 December 2022) was a British Thoroughbred racehorse and sire.

Background
Kayf Tara was bred in England by the Meon Valley Stud. His dam Colorspin won the Irish Oaks and had previously produced the multiple Group One winner Opera House. He was owned by Ahmed Al Maktoum before being transferred to the ownership of Godolphin Racing.

Kayf Tara died on 8 December 2022, at the age of 28.

Racing career
Kayf Tara won the Ascot Gold Cup and the Irish St. Leger in 1998. In the following year he won the Prix Kergorlay, Goodwood Cup and Prix Vicomtesse Vigier before taking a second Irish St. Leger. In 2000 he won the Yorkshire Cup and a second Ascot Gold Cup.

The recurrence of an old injury brought Kayf Tara's racing career to an end.

Honours
Kayf Tara won the Cartier European Top Stayer three years in a row from 1998 to 2000.

Stud record
Kayf Tara stood as stud stallion at Overbury Stud in Overbury, Worcestershire. He has had considerable success as a National Hunt stallion. His most successful offspring have included Planet of Sound (Punchestown Gold Cup), Blaklion (RSA Chase), Thistlecrack, Special Tiara, Tea For Two (Feltham Novices' Chase), Ballyandy (Champion Bumper), Identity Thief (Liverpool Hurdle, Fighting Fifth Hurdle) and Carruthers (Hennessy Gold Cup).

Pedigree

References

1994 racehorse births
2022 racehorse deaths
Cartier Award winners
Irish Classic Race winners
Racehorses bred in the United Kingdom
Thoroughbred family 13-e